Charlie is a 2015 Indian Kannada action film written and directed by Shiva, and stars Krishna and Vaishali Deepak. Film score and soundtrack were composed by Veer Samarth, and cinematography by Girish R. Gowda.

Cast

 Krishna as Cheluvanarayana Swamy "Charlie"
 Vaishali Deepak as Gayathri
 Milana Nagaraj as Purvi
 Sharath Lohitashwa
 Raghava Uday
 Gurunandan
 Manju Rangashankar
 Killer Venkatesh
 Bhaskar Surya
 M. S. Umesh
 Honnavalli Krishna
 Sanketh Kashi
 Kamalashree
 Suchithra
 Apoorva

Soundtrack

Veer Samarth composed film score and the soundtrack, lyrics for which were penned by Chethan Kumar, Yogaraj Bhat and Kaviraj. The soundtrack album consists of five tracks.

References

2015 films
2010s Kannada-language films